The following highways are numbered 498:

Japan
  Japan National Route 498

United Kingdom
  A498 road

United States
  Louisiana Highway 498
  Kentucky Route 498
  Maryland Route 498 (former)
  Mississippi Highway 498
  New Mexico State Road 498
  Texas State Highway Loop 498 (former)
  Farm to Market Road 498